Ahmet Suat Özyazıcı (20 April 1936 – 18 February 2023) was a Turkish footballer and a successful manager. He competed in the men's tournament at the 1960 Summer Olympics.

Career
Özyazıcı played football at the club İdmanocağı in his hometown Trabzon for several years.

Following his retirement, he became a manager. In the 1975–76 season, he led Trabzonspor to its first league championship title. This was the first time, a team besides the Istanbul clubs Fenerbahçe, Galatasaray, and Beşiktaş (called the "Big Three") to win the Süper Lig. Further titles came with Ozyazici in the seasons 1976–77, 1978–79 and 1979–80. Trabzonspor remained until 2010 the only team to win the league title besides the "Big Three".

Özyazici's Trabzonspor showed success in the UEFA Champions League by beating English giant Liverpool F.C. in the late 1970s. After his successful years at Trabzonspor, he left his post to manage Bursaspor, Sarıyer, Vanspor and Sarıyer G.K. (Istanbul). He is considered one of the most successful managers in the history of Turkish football gaining four Süper Lig titles, a performance reached by Fatih Terim only. He has won three Turkish Cups and several other cups, all achieved with Trabzonspor.

Honors

As manager
 Trabzonspor
 Turkish Super League: 1975–76, 1976–77, 1979–80, 1983–84
 Turkish Cup: 1976–77, 1977–78, 1983–84; runner-up 1975–76
 President's Cup: 1975–76, 1976–77, 1977–78, 1979–80, 1982–83; runner-up 1983–84
 Prime Minister's Cup: 1975–76, 1977–78
 Turkish Second League: 1973–74

References

1936 births
2023 deaths
Turkish footballers
Association football midfielders
Olympic footballers of Turkey
Footballers at the 1960 Summer Olympics
Trabzon İdmanocağı players
Trabzonspor footballers
Turkish football managers
Trabzonspor managers
Bursaspor managers
Sarıyer S.K. managers
Sportspeople from Trabzon